The canton of Izernore is a former administrative division in eastern France. It was disbanded following the French canton reorganisation which came into effect in March 2015. It consisted of 10 communes, which joined the canton of Pont-d'Ain in 2015. It had 5,804 inhabitants (2012).

The canton comprised 10 communes:

Bolozon
Ceignes
Izernore
Leyssard
Matafelon-Granges
Nurieux-Volognat
Peyriat
Samognat
Serrières-sur-Ain
Sonthonnax-la-Montagne

Demographics

See also
Cantons of the Ain department 
Communes of France

References

Former cantons of Ain
2015 disestablishments in France
States and territories disestablished in 2015